The Quays Newry is a major retail and leisure centre situated in Newry, County Armagh and is one of Northern Ireland's top shopping destinations with its anchor tenants being Sainsbury's and Marks & Spencer. The centre also contains a 10 screen cinema operated by Omniplex Cinemas and has over 1,000 car parking spaces.

History
The Sainsbury's store opened in October 1998, while the rest of the centre opened in 1999. The Quays was constructed on the site of the old coal yards which served the Albert Basin. An old warehouse, which was part of these yards was incorporated into the centre and is now used as office and retail space.

Roches Stores opened their first store in Northern Ireland in the centre in 1999, but this store was closed in February 2003 to make way for a new Debenhams store which opened in October 2004, and later closed in 2021. 

In February 2018, Marks & Spencer relocated from the Buttercrane Centre to The Quays where a new 30,000 sq ft store was built on the site of the old Sainsbury's filling station.

Cross-border shopping
The centre has experienced shoppers from the Republic of Ireland, who cross the border to Newry to buy cheaper goods due to difference in currency. This remarkable increase in cross-border trade has become so widespread that it has lent its name to a general phenomenon known as the Newry effect.

Tenants

 Sainsbury's
 Argos (located in Sainsbury's)
 Marks & Spencer 
 Next
 River Island
 Buzzard Comics
 Waterstones
 Skechers
 PureGym
 Boots
 DFI Beds NI
 Semichem
 H&M
 Superdry
 Starbucks
 Eddie Rocket's
 Caffè Nero
 Claire's
 Søstrene Grene
 Pavers Shoes
 Smiggle

References

External links
 Official website

Newry
Shopping centres in Northern Ireland
Shopping malls established in 1998